The 1981 Summer Deaflympics, officially known as the 14th Summer Deaflympics, is an international multi-sport event that was celebrated from July 23 to August 1, 1981, in Cologne, Germany.

Sports 

 Athletics
 Basketball
 Cycling
 Football
 Handball
 Shooting
 Swimming
 Table Tennis
 Tennis
 Volleyball
 Water Polo
 Wrestling

Medal Tally

References

Deaflympics
International sports competitions hosted by Germany
Summer Deaflympics
Summer Deaflympics
1980s in Cologne
Sports competitions in Cologne
Summer Deaflympics